Neumorphism is a design style used in graphical user interfaces. It is commonly identified by a soft and light look, (for which it is sometimes referred to as soft UI) with elements that appear to protrude from or dent into the background rather than float on top of it. It is sometimes considered a medium between skeuomorphism and flat design.

History 
The term neumorphism was coined by Jason Kelly as a portmanteau of neo and skeuomorphism, emphasizing its role as a semi-revival of skeuomorphism. Many neumorphic design concepts can be traced to Alexander Plyuto, who created a mockup for a banking app showing various elements of neumorphic design. He posted it to the website Dribbble, where it quickly blew up to 3,000 views.

On November 12, 2020, Apple released macOS Big Sur. The update included graphical designs that featured neumorphism prominently, such as the app icons and use of translucency.

Characteristics and Purpose 
Neumorphism is a form of minimalism characterized by a soft and light look, often using pastel colors with low contrast. Elements are usually the same color as the background, and are only distinguished by shadows and highlights surrounding the element. This gives the elements the appearance that they are "protruding" from the background, or that they are dented into it.

Designers may like the look and feel of neumorphism because it provides a middle ground between skeuomorphism and flat design. Specifically, it aims to look plausibly realistic, while still looking clean and adhering to minimalism.

Criticism 
Neumorphism has received a lot of criticism, notably for its lack of accessibility, difficulty in implementation, low contrast, and incompatibility with certain brands.

References

Design
Graphical user interfaces